The San Nicolao Tunnel is a motorway tunnel in the Swiss canton of Ticino. The tunnel is situated on the eastern bank of Lake Lugano, between Bissone and Maroggia, and forms part of the A2 motorway that links Lugano and the north of Switzerland with Chiasso and Italy.

References

External links
 

Transport in Ticino
Road tunnels in Switzerland